Filipe Gui Paradela Maciel da Costa (born 30 August 1984) is a Portuguese retired footballer who played as a midfielder.

Football career

Early career
Born in Lisbon, Costa began his career at S.L. Benfica, also being loaned to C.F. Os Belenenses and Amora F.C. during his formative years.

In 2003, he moved to Italy's A.C. Reggiana 1919, but failed to appear in any games in the season's Serie C1/A.

Greece
In January 2005, Costa joined Superleague Greece club Ionikos FC. Exactly two years later he was loaned to Athlitiki Enosi Larissa FC, which eventually won the domestic cup as the player appeared in one match in the tournament, the 31 January quarter-finals against PAE Kerkyra.

During his two-and-a-half-year stay in the country, Costa was voted by fans and league players and coaches for two straight years to the annual All-Star game, held between the best Greek and foreign players.

England / Romania
On 1 September 2007, Costa signed a one-year contract with Leeds United. He made seven appearances, all but one as a substitute, and was sent off in a rare start, a game against Bury for the Football League Trophy; his injuries otherwise largely prevented him from playing.

In mid-January 2008, Costa joined Scottish club Falkirk for a trial, but returned to Elland Road after this proved unsuccessful. He was released in April.

For the 2008–09 campaign, Costa moved to Romania with FC Politehnica Timișoara, with the contract including a special clause that stated it could be terminated if the player suffered an injury. He was released on 4 August 2008.

Bulgaria
In September 2008, Costa signed for PFC CSKA Sofia. He made his debut for his new team on 4 October against FC Vihren Sandanski, playing a total of five matches during the season. In January of the following year CSKA released the player, via arbitration commission of the Bulgarian Football Union.

On 28 January 2009, Costa joined PFC Levski Sofia on a three-year deal. He made his competitive debut also against Vihren, in the first game of the second round of the championship, a 3–2 win. On 9 May he appeared in The Eternal Derby against ex-team CSKA, with a 2–0 away win; in total, he contributed with eight appearances for an eventual league win.

On 21 June 2009, it was announced that Levski were trying to sell Costa. Club coach Emil Velev decided to sell the player due to his poor performances in the second round of the campaign.

Return to Portugal
On 13 July 2009, Costa returned to Portugal after six years, joining C.D. Nacional. He was not registered for the season's UEFA Europa League by the Madeirans and, on 5 January 2010, without making any official appearances, he was released, quickly signing with G.D. Estoril Praia in the Segunda Liga.

Honours
Larissa
Greek Football Cup: 2006–07

Levski
First Professional Football League: 2008–09

References

External links

Levski official profile

1984 births
Living people
Footballers from Lisbon
Portuguese footballers
Association football midfielders
Liga Portugal 2 players
C.D. Nacional players
G.D. Estoril Praia players
A.C. Reggiana 1919 players
Super League Greece players
Football League (Greece) players
Ionikos F.C. players
Athlitiki Enosi Larissa F.C. players
Panserraikos F.C. players
Veria F.C. players
Panachaiki F.C. players
English Football League players
Leeds United F.C. players
FC Politehnica Timișoara players
First Professional Football League (Bulgaria) players
PFC CSKA Sofia players
PFC Levski Sofia players
Cypriot First Division players
Enosis Neon Paralimni FC players
Portugal youth international footballers
Portuguese expatriate footballers
Expatriate footballers in Italy
Expatriate footballers in Romania
Expatriate footballers in Bulgaria
Expatriate footballers in Greece
Expatriate footballers in Cyprus
Portuguese expatriate sportspeople in Italy
Portuguese expatriate sportspeople in Romania
Portuguese expatriate sportspeople in Bulgaria
Portuguese expatriate sportspeople in Greece
Portuguese expatriate sportspeople in Cyprus